The huge moth family Noctuidae contains the following genera:

A B C D E F G H I J K L M N O P Q R S T U V W X Y Z

Valeria
Valerietta
Valeriodes
Vallagyris
Vandana
Vapara
Varia
Varicosia
Varina
Veia
Velazconia
Vescisa
Vespola
Vestura
Via
Victrix
Vietteania
Viettentia
Villosa
Viminia
Violaphotia
Virgo
Viridemas
Vittappressa
Vogia
Volazaha
Vulcanica

References 

 Natural History Museum Lepidoptera genus database

 
Noctuid genera V